The 1983 Torneo Descentralizado, the top tier of Peruvian football (soccer), was played by 17 teams. The national champion was Sporting Cristal.

Top 6 from First Stage played in Lima for the Championship without carrying their whole season record; top 3 entered that round with Bonus of 3, 2, and 1 point respectively.
For 1984 First Division grew to 25 teams. So besides Sport Pilsen which gained the right to be promoted, 9 other teams were invited to join First Division.

Teams

Results

First stage

Final group

External links 
 RSSSF Peru 1983

Peru
Football (soccer)
Peruvian Primera División seasons